WSKK 102.3 FM is a radio station licensed to Ripley, Mississippi. The station broadcasts a classic hits/classic rock format and is owned by John and Melinda Marsalis, through licensee JC Media LLC.

References

External links
WSKK's official website

SKK
Classic hits radio stations in the United States